One ship of the United States Navy has been named USS Wyoming in honor of the Wyoming Valley in eastern Pennsylvania that runs along the Susquehanna River.  Three others have been named in honor of the state of Wyoming.

  was a screw sloop that operated on the California coast during the American Civil War and fought the forces of a Japanese warlord in the Battle of Shimonoseki.
  (1910–1947) was the lead ship of her class of battleships.

See also
SS Equality State (T-ACS-8), an auxiliary Keystone State-class crane ship launched in 1961 currently in ready reserve since 1989.

United States Navy ship names